The Still Alarm is a 1918 American silent drama film directed by Colin Campbell and starring Tom Santschi, Bessie Eyton, and Eugenie Besserer. It is an adaptation of the 1887 play The Still Alarm by Joseph Arthur.

Cast
 Tom Santschi as Jack Manley 
 Bessie Eyton as Eleanor Fordham 
 Eugenie Besserer as Undetermined Role 
 William Scott as Undetermined Role 
 Fritzi Brunette as Undetermined Role

References

Bibliography
 Donald W. McCaffrey & Christopher P. Jacobs. Guide to the Silent Years of American Cinema. Greenwood Publishing, 1999.

External links

 

1918 films
1918 drama films
1910s English-language films
American silent feature films
Silent American drama films
American black-and-white films
Films directed by Colin Campbell
American films based on plays
1910s American films